The Biggest Loser is a reality television format which started with the American TV show The Biggest Loser in 2004. The show centers on overweight and obese contestants attempting to lose the most weight; the winner receives a cash prize. There are different variations of The Biggest Loser around the world. Each country has made its own adaptation of the show; however, the contestants always have the same goal: to lose the highest percentage of weight (or most weight) to become the "biggest loser". There is no minimum or maximum weight limit for the show but most males tend to weigh over or near 300 lb (136 kg). Females tend to weigh over or near 200 lb (91 kg).

In addition to individual contestants, some seasons in some international adaptations have featured couples or even whole families.

International versions

 Franchise with a currently airing season
 Franchise with an upcoming season
 Franchise whose status is unknown
 Franchise no longer in production

Biggest Loser records
Heaviest contestant

Biggest weight loss
 Male: Alexander Repyanchuk of the Weighted and Happy  5 (Ukrainian version) lost 60.13% of his total body weight
 Female: Rachel Frederickson of The Biggest Loser 15 of the US version lost 59.62% of her total body weight

Other
Jodie Prenger from series 2 of the UK version was the first female biggest loser worldwide, losing 46.85% of her original body weight.

Other media
The Biggest Loser RunWalk is the official race series of The Biggest Loser. Dan and Jackie Evans from Season Five are the national spokespeople.

The Biggest Loser is a video game for Wii and Nintendo DS. It was released in North America on October 6, 2009 and Europe on November 13, 2009.

The Biggest Loser: Ultimate Workout is a video game for Xbox 360 which uses its Kinect camera. Developed by Blitz Games and published by THQ, it was released in North America on November 4, 2010 and Europe on November 10, 2010.

The Biggest Loser: Challenge is a video game for Wii released on November 4, 2010 in North America and November 12, 2010 in Europe.

See also
 Weight loss camp
 Downsize Me!
 Operation Transformation (TV series)

References

 
Banijay franchises
Reality television series franchises
Obesity
Weight loss